Christoph Kreienbühl (born 14 January 1955) is a Swiss former swimmer. He competed in the men's 1500 metre freestyle at the 1972 Summer Olympics.

References

External links
 

1955 births
Living people
Olympic swimmers of Switzerland
Swimmers at the 1972 Summer Olympics
Place of birth missing (living people)
Swiss male freestyle swimmers